Bakura may refer to:

 Bakura (Star Wars), a fictional planet within the Star Wars universe
 Ryo Bakura, a Yu-Gi-Oh! character
 Amane Bakura, Ryo Bakura's sister in the Yu-Gi-Oh! manga
 Bakura, Nigeria, a Local Government Area of Zamfara State

See also 
 The Truce at Bakura, a 1993 Star Wars novel by Kathy Tyers taking place after Return of the Jedi
 Bankura

it:Pianeti di Guerre stellari#Bakura